Lacera uniformis is a moth of the family Erebidae. It is found from the Indian subcontinent and Sundaland, east to Queensland and Vanuatu.

References

Moths described in 1979
Lacera
Moths of Oceania
Moths of Asia